East Sister Island can refer to:

 East Sister Island (Andaman and Nicobar Islands), an Indian island
 East Sister Island (Ontario), an island in Ontario, Canada